The Braille pattern dots-256 is a 6-dot braille cell with both middle, and the bottom right dots raised, or an 8-dot braille cell with both upper-middle, and the lower-middle right dots raised. It is represented by the Unicode code point U+2832, and in Braille ASCII with the number 4.

Unified Braille

In unified international braille, the braille pattern dots-256 is used to represent punctuation, and otherwise as needed.

Table of unified braille values

Other braille

Plus dots 7 and 8

Related to Braille pattern dots-256 are Braille patterns 2567, 2568, and 25678, which are used in 8-dot braille systems, such as Gardner-Salinas and Luxembourgish Braille.

Related 8-dot kantenji patterns

In the Japanese kantenji braille, the standard 8-dot Braille patterns 368, 1368, 3468, and 13468 are the patterns related to Braille pattern dots-256, since the two additional dots of kantenji patterns 0256, 2567, and 02567 are placed above the base 6-dot cell, instead of below, as in standard 8-dot braille.

Kantenji using braille patterns 368, 1368, 3468, or 13468

This listing includes kantenji using Braille pattern dots-256 for all 6349 kanji found in JIS C 6226-1978.

Unlike most kantenji patterns,  is distinguished positionally, where it usually indicates a 心 when used finally, but ⽊ or ⺾ when used initially, and any of the above when medial to a kantenji pattern. ⽊ and ⺾ are also indicated by other, unique kantenji cells, but the large number of kanji utilizing these elements necessitates further disambiguating in kantenji patterns, which are limited to three cells apiece.

  - 心

Variants and thematic compounds

  -  selector 6 + 心  =  奄
  -  心 + selector 1  =  桜
  -  心 + selector 2  =  菊
  -  心 + selector 3  =  粟
  -  心 + selector 5  =  必
  -  心 + selector 6  =  黍

Compounds of 心

  -  ぬ/力 + 心  =  忍
  -  い/糹/#2 + ぬ/力 + 心  =  綛
  -  心 + ぬ/力 + 心  =  荵
  -  つ/土 + 心  =  志
  -  ゑ/訁 + 心  =  誌
  -  や/疒 + つ/土 + 心  =  痣
  -  ほ/方 + 心  =  忘
  -  よ/广 + 心  =  応
  -  よ/广 + よ/广 + 心  =  應
  -  み/耳 + よ/广 + 心  =  軈
  -  宿 + 心  =  忠
  -  り/分 + 心  =  念
  -  き/木 + り/分 + 心  =  棯
  -  の/禾 + り/分 + 心  =  稔
  -  せ/食 + り/分 + 心  =  鯰
  -  数 + 心  =  忽
  -  る/忄 + 心  =  惚
  -  ふ/女 + 心  =  怒
  -  た/⽥ + 心  =  思
  -  ⺼ + た/⽥ + 心  =  腮
  -  お/頁 + た/⽥ + 心  =  顋
  -  せ/食 + た/⽥ + 心  =  鰓
  -  な/亻 + 心  =  怠
  -  さ/阝 + 心  =  怨
  -  こ/子 + 心  =  怱
  -  心 + 心  =  葱
  -  え/訁 + 心  =  恋
  -  え/訁 + え/訁 + 心  =  戀
  -  龸 + 心  =  恐
  -  み/耳 + 心  =  恥
  -  け/犬 + 心  =  恩
  -  め/目 + 心  =  息
  -  火 + め/目 + 心  =  熄
  -  む/車 + 心  =  恵
  -  む/車 + む/車 + 心  =  惠
  -  れ/口 + 心  =  患
  -  selector 1 + 心  =  悪
  -  selector 1 + selector 1 + 心  =  惡
  -  か/金 + selector 1 + 心  =  鐚
  -  火 + 心  =  悲
  -  も/門 + 心  =  悶
  -  囗 + 心  =  惑
  -  き/木 + 心  =  想
  -  く/艹 + 心  =  愚
  -  ひ/辶 + 心  =  感
  -  て/扌 + ひ/辶 + 心  =  撼
  -  む/車 + ひ/辶 + 心  =  轗
  -  ゐ/幺 + 心  =  慈
  -  ら/月 + 心  =  態
  -  と/戸 + 心  =  慰
  -  の/禾 + 心  =  愁
  -  す/発 + 心  =  慮
  -  に/氵 + す/発 + 心  =  濾
  -  か/金 + す/発 + 心  =  鑢
  -  そ/馬 + 心  =  慶
  -  せ/食 + 心  =  憩
  -  せ/食 + せ/食 + 心  =  憇
  -  う/宀/#3 + 心  =  憲
  -  や/疒 + 心  =  懇
  -  ゆ/彳 + 心  =  懲
  -  き/木 + 心 + 心  =  蕊
  -  く/艹 + 心 + 心  =  蘂
  -  り/分 + 宿 + 心  =  忿
  -  ふ/女 + 宿 + 心  =  恕
  -  つ/土 + 宿 + 心  =  恚
  -  ち/竹 + 宿 + 心  =  悉
  -  ゆ/彳 + 宿 + 心  =  愈
  -  み/耳 + 宿 + 心  =  慇
  -  け/犬 + 宿 + 心  =  慧
  -  そ/馬 + 宿 + 心  =  憑
  -  ぬ/力 + 宿 + 心  =  懃
  -  に/氵 + 宿 + 心  =  沁
  -  む/車 + 宿 + 心  =  蟋

Compounds of 奄

  -  仁/亻 + 心  =  俺
  -  て/扌 + 心  =  掩
  -  ま/石 + 心  =  竜
  -  に/氵 + 心  =  滝
  -  ま/石 + ま/石 + 心  =  龍
  -  つ/土 + ま/石 + 心  =  壟
  -  へ/⺩ + ま/石 + 心  =  瓏
  -  ち/竹 + ま/石 + 心  =  籠
  -  心 + ま/石 + 心  =  蘢
  -  さ/阝 + ま/石 + 心  =  隴
  -  き/木 + ま/石 + 心  =  槞
  -  ち/竹 + 心  =  電
  -  に/氵 + selector 6 + 心  =  淹
  -  く/艹 + selector 6 + 心  =  菴
  -  も/門 + selector 6 + 心  =  閹

Compounds of 桜 and ⽊

  -  心 + う/宀/#3  =  杉
  -  き/木 + 心 + う/宀/#3  =  彬
  -  心 + れ/口  =  杏
  -  心 + こ/子  =  松
  -  に/氵 + 心 + こ/子  =  淞
  -  心 + 心 + こ/子  =  菘
  -  と/戸 + 心 + こ/子  =  鬆
  -  心 + 心 + こ/子  =  菘
  -  心 + 日  =  柏
  -  心 + さ/阝  =  柳
  -  心 + し/巿  =  柿
  -  心 + 宿  =  桃
  -  心 + と/戸  =  桐
  -  心 + ゑ/訁  =  桑
  -  心 + り/分  =  桧
  -  心 + 心 + り/分  =  檜
  -  心 + は/辶  =  梅
  -  心 + ろ/十  =  梓
  -  心 + け/犬  =  椅
  -  心 + む/車  =  楓
  -  心 + お/頁  =  榎
  -  心 + て/扌  =  欅
  -  心 + 心 + selector 1  =  櫻
  -  心 + 宿 + こ/子  =  李
  -  心 + き/木 + う/宀/#3  =  杜
  -  心 + 数 + き/木  =  杞
  -  心 + 龸 + 数  =  杤
  -  心 + 龸 + ひ/辶  =  杷
  -  心 + 龸 + 比  =  枇
  -  心 + 宿 + ほ/方  =  枋
  -  心 + 龸 + り/分  =  枌
  -  心 + selector 6 + こ/子  =  枩
  -  心 + れ/口 + は/辶  =  枳
  -  心 + も/門 + selector 5  =  枸
  -  心 + す/発 + selector 1  =  柊
  -  心 + selector 4 + る/忄  =  柑
  -  心 + う/宀/#3 + ま/石  =  柘
  -  心 + た/⽥ + selector 4  =  柚
  -  心 + 宿 + さ/阝  =  柞
  -  心 + ん/止 + い/糹/#2  =  柾
  -  心 + 比 + は/辶  =  栂
  -  心 + 数 + ま/石  =  栃
  -  心 + 数 + め/目  =  栢
  -  心 + 龸 + む/車  =  栩
  -  心 + ふ/女 + selector 4  =  栴
  -  心 + 宿 + つ/土  =  桂
  -  心 + お/頁 + selector 1  =  桾
  -  心 + 宿 + れ/口  =  梔
  -  心 + 日 + な/亻  =  梗
  -  心 + 宿 + な/亻  =  梛
  -  心 + ら/月 + れ/口  =  梧
  -  心 + の/禾 + ぬ/力  =  梨
  -  心 + 宿 + め/目  =  棉
  -  心 + う/宀/#3 + ね/示  =  棕
  -  心 + き/木 + 数  =  棘
  -  心 + selector 6 + は/辶  =  棠
  -  心 + 龸 + ゆ/彳  =  棣
  -  心 + 龸 + れ/口  =  椋
  -  心 + 宿 + い/糹/#2  =  椎
  -  心 + selector 1 + selector 1  =  椏
  -  心 + う/宀/#3 + ゑ/訁  =  椒
  -  心 + 龸 + も/門  =  椚
  -  心 + み/耳 + さ/阝  =  椰
  -  心 + も/門 + selector 6  =  椶
  -  心 + selector 1 + き/木  =  椹
  -  心 + け/犬 + 日  =  椿
  -  心 + 宿 + 数  =  楊
  -  心 + selector 1 + よ/广  =  楙
  -  心 + き/木 + き/木  =  楚
  -  心 + selector 6 + ら/月  =  楜
  -  心 + 比 + ひ/辶  =  楝
  -  心 + 比 + み/耳  =  楠
  -  心 + selector 5 + ゆ/彳  =  楡
  -  心 + せ/食 + selector 6  =  楢
  -  心 + と/戸 + 日  =  楮
  -  心 + る/忄 + き/木  =  楳
  -  心 + ま/石 + し/巿  =  楴
  -  心 + の/禾 + 火  =  楸
  -  心 + う/宀/#3 + ゆ/彳  =  榁
  -  心 + ね/示 + し/巿  =  榊
  -  心 + selector 4 + て/扌  =  榑
  -  心 + や/疒 + さ/阝  =  榔
  -  心 + け/犬 + の/禾  =  榛
  -  心 + 龸 + 日  =  榠
  -  心 + 宿 + も/門  =  榧
  -  心 + 宿 + ⺼  =  榲
  -  心 + ら/月 + た/⽥  =  榴
  -  心 + か/金 + ら/月  =  榾
  -  心 + selector 5 + や/疒  =  榿
  -  心 + お/頁 + に/氵  =  槐
  -  心 + selector 1 + め/目  =  槙
  -  心 + ひ/辶 + う/宀/#3  =  槭
  -  心 + 囗 + selector 6  =  槲
  -  心 + け/犬 + 宿  =  槻
  -  心 + 宿 + き/木  =  槿
  -  心 + ゆ/彳 + よ/广  =  樅
  -  心 + う/宀/#3 + や/疒  =  樒
  -  心 + ち/竹 + selector 1  =  樗
  -  心 + ま/石 + ろ/十  =  樟
  -  心 + つ/土 + す/発  =  樫
  -  心 + く/艹 + か/金  =  樺
  -  心 + み/耳 + 氷/氵  =  橄
  -  心 + 宿 + よ/广  =  橘
  -  心 + す/発 + と/戸  =  橙
  -  心 + そ/馬 + selector 6  =  橡
  -  心 + 宿 + た/⽥  =  橿
  -  心 + 龸 + 囗  =  檀
  -  心 + selector 1 + な/亻  =  檍
  -  心 + 宿 + り/分  =  檎
  -  心 + 龸 + ま/石  =  檗
  -  心 + 日 + ゐ/幺  =  檪
  -  心 + 宿 + そ/馬  =  檬
  -  心 + う/宀/#3 + を/貝  =  檳
  -  心 + 宿 + て/扌  =  檸
  -  心 + う/宀/#3 + む/車  =  櫁
  -  心 + selector 6 + み/耳  =  櫚
  -  心 + ゐ/幺 + そ/馬  =  櫞
  -  心 + 宿 + 日  =  櫟
  -  心 + 龸 + た/⽥  =  櫨
  -  心 + め/目 + す/発  =  欖
  -  心 + け/犬 + め/目  =  欟

Compounds of 菊 and ⺾

  -  心 + め/目  =  艾
  -  心 + か/金  =  芋
  -  心 + の/禾  =  芝
  -  心 + 仁/亻  =  芥
  -  心 + を/貝  =  芹
  -  心 + な/亻  =  苔
  -  心 + 比  =  苺
  -  心 + よ/广  =  茅
  -  心 + 氷/氵  =  茜
  -  心 + ん/止  =  茨
  -  心 + き/木  =  茶
  -  心 + み/耳  =  茸
  -  心 + ら/月  =  菅
  -  心 + く/艹  =  菱
  -  心 + 火  =  萩
  -  心 + い/糹/#2  =  葦
  -  心 + 心  =  葱
  -  心 + す/発  =  葵
  -  心 + ほ/方  =  蓬
  -  心 + ひ/辶  =  蓮
  -  心 + せ/食  =  蔦
  -  心 + 龸  =  蕨
  -  心 + ぬ/力  =  薊
  -  心 + ⺼  =  藍
  -  心 + ふ/女  =  藤
  -  心 + 心 + ふ/女  =  籐
  -  心 + た/⽥  =  蘆
  -  心 + そ/馬  =  蘇
  -  心 + も/門  =  蘭
  -  て/扌 + 心 + selector 2  =  掬
  -  心 + 心 + selector 2  =  椈
  -  と/戸 + 心 + selector 2  =  鞠
  -  心 + 比 + も/門  =  芍
  -  心 + selector 5 + ほ/方  =  芒
  -  心 + selector 3 + け/犬  =  芙
  -  心 + 宿 + と/戸  =  芦
  -  心 + selector 1 + 宿  =  芫
  -  心 + 宿 + ひ/辶  =  芭
  -  く/艹 + 宿 + 心  =  芯
  -  心 + 仁/亻 + ろ/十  =  苓
  -  心 + ま/石 + selector 1  =  苙
  -  心 + 龸 + め/目  =  苜
  -  心 + selector 4 + も/門  =  苡
  -  心 + 数 + て/扌  =  苧
  -  心 + り/分 + か/金  =  苹
  -  心 + ぬ/力 + れ/口  =  茄
  -  心 + さ/阝 + う/宀/#3  =  茆
  -  心 + き/木 + selector 5  =  茉
  -  心 + ほ/方 + れ/口  =  茗
  -  心 + selector 4 + ぬ/力  =  茘
  -  心 + な/亻 + け/犬  =  茯
  -  心 + selector 5 + か/金  =  茱
  -  心 + 日 + す/発  =  荀
  -  心 + り/分 + 囗  =  荅
  -  心 + ね/示 + ね/示  =  荊
  -  心 + 仁/亻 + に/氵  =  荏
  -  心 + selector 5 + と/戸  =  荳
  -  心 + 宿 + 火  =  荻
  -  心 + り/分 + も/門  =  荼
  -  心 + 宿 + ぬ/力  =  莉
  -  心 + 氷/氵 + ほ/方  =  莎
  -  心 + 龸 + は/辶  =  莓
  -  心 + う/宀/#3 + 宿  =  莞
  -  心 + の/禾 + ゐ/幺  =  莠
  -  心 + 比 + や/疒  =  莨
  -  心 + 囗 + selector 1  =  莪
  -  心 + き/木 + な/亻  =  莱
  -  心 + そ/馬 + う/宀/#3  =  莵
  -  心 + し/巿 + せ/食  =  菁
  -  心 + 日 + 比  =  菎
  -  心 + り/分 + 日  =  菖
  -  心 + ぬ/力 + 宿  =  菟
  -  心 + に/氵 + ひ/辶  =  菠
  -  心 + 宿 + ま/石  =  菩
  -  心 + 龸 + き/木  =  菫
  -  心 + こ/子 + こ/子  =  菰
  -  心 + selector 4 + 火  =  菲
  -  心 + う/宀/#3 + き/木  =  菻
  -  心 + 宿 + ゑ/訁  =  菽
  -  心 + 龸 + と/戸  =  萄
  -  心 + selector 4 + と/戸  =  萇
  -  心 + う/宀/#3 + そ/馬  =  萓
  -  心 + の/禾 + と/戸  =  萪
  -  心 + う/宀/#3 + 日  =  萱
  -  心 + 宿 + か/金  =  萵
  -  心 + 宿 + ゆ/彳  =  萸
  -  心 + ゆ/彳 + ふ/女  =  葎
  -  心 + 宿 + 氷/氵  =  葛
  -  心 + 龸 + ほ/方  =  葡
  -  心 + れ/口 + ろ/十  =  葫
  -  心 + 龸 + の/禾  =  葭
  -  心 + selector 4 + の/禾  =  葮
  -  心 + ほ/方 + ち/竹  =  葹
  -  心 + へ/⺩ + selector 2  =  蒋
  -  心 + 宿 + ね/示  =  蒜
  -  心 + う/宀/#3 + も/門  =  蒟
  -  心 + selector 4 + ほ/方  =  蒡
  -  心 + に/氵 + ほ/方  =  蒲
  -  心 + り/分 + け/犬  =  蒹
  -  心 + ゆ/彳 + ゆ/彳  =  蒻
  -  心 + 比 + え/訁  =  蒿
  -  心 + う/宀/#3 + た/⽥  =  蓉
  -  心 + と/戸 + selector 2  =  蓍
  -  心 + 宿 + 比  =  蓖
  -  心 + う/宀/#3 + て/扌  =  蓴
  -  心 + む/車 + selector 2  =  蓼
  -  心 + 宿 + 宿  =  蓿
  -  心 + 龸 + す/発  =  蔆
  -  心 + 宿 + ふ/女  =  蔔
  -  心 + よ/广 + と/戸  =  蔗
  -  心 + よ/广 + く/艹  =  蔬
  -  心 + 数 + 数  =  蕀
  -  心 + れ/口 + し/巿  =  蕁
  -  心 + 日 + ろ/十  =  蕈
  -  心 + い/糹/#2 + 火  =  蕉
  -  心 + 宿 + の/禾  =  蕎
  -  心 + け/犬 + せ/食  =  蕕
  -  心 + み/耳 + れ/口  =  蕗
  -  心 + selector 5 + 龸  =  蕣
  -  心 + む/車 + 火  =  蕪
  -  心 + ぬ/力 + ゆ/彳  =  蕭
  -  心 + お/頁 + よ/广  =  蕷
  -  心 + に/氵 + ⺼  =  薀
  -  心 + ゆ/彳 + 氷/氵  =  薇
  -  心 + の/禾 + す/発  =  薐
  -  心 + 宿 + は/辶  =  薑
  -  心 + 囗 + れ/口  =  薔
  -  心 + ろ/十 + ま/石  =  薛
  -  心 + 龸 + 火  =  薤
  -  心 + す/発 + 日  =  薯
  -  心 + さ/阝 + 龸  =  薺
  -  心 + う/宀/#3 + の/禾  =  藜
  -  心 + ゑ/訁 + 日  =  藷
  -  心 + う/宀/#3 + い/糹/#2  =  藺
  -  心 + 宿 + に/氵  =  藻
  -  心 + お/頁 + 数  =  藾
  -  心 + ん/止 + お/頁  =  蘋
  -  心 + 龸 + そ/馬  =  蘓
  -  心 + selector 6 + ま/石  =  蘗
  -  心 + せ/食 + そ/馬  =  蘚
  -  心 + す/発 + い/糹/#2  =  蘿
  -  心 + う/宀/#3 + 火  =  韮

Compounds of 粟

  -  心 + に/氵  =  栗
  -  ち/竹 + 心 + に/氵  =  篥
  -  心 + に/氵 + ね/示  =  瓢

Compounds of 必

  -  氷/氵 + 心  =  泌
  -  へ/⺩ + 心  =  瑟
  -  え/訁 + 心 + selector 5  =  謐

Other compounds

  -  ね/示 + 心  =  襲
  -  心 + つ/土  =  瓜
  -  れ/口 + 心 + つ/土  =  呱
  -  き/木 + 心 + つ/土  =  柧
  -  け/犬 + 心 + つ/土  =  瓠
  -  む/車 + 心 + つ/土  =  瓣
  -  心 + ま/石  =  麻
  -  れ/口 + 心 + ま/石  =  嘛
  -  や/疒 + 心 + ま/石  =  痲
  -  の/禾 + 心 + ま/石  =  糜
  -  い/糹/#2 + 心 + ま/石  =  縻
  -  ゐ/幺 + 心 + ま/石  =  麼
  -  に/氵 + に/氵 + 心  =  瀧
  -  心 + た/⽥ + さ/阝  =  稗
  -  心 + 宿 + す/発  =  稷
  -  心 + ろ/十 + よ/广  =  笹
  -  心 + す/発 + き/木  =  篠

Notes

Braille patterns